Sandra Klemenschits and Andreja Klepač were the defending champions, having won the event in 2013, but both players chose to participate with different partners. Klemenschits chose to participate with Yulia Putintseva, losing in the first round, while Klepač chose to participate with Mandy Minella, losing in the semifinals.

Lourdes Domínguez Lino and Beatriz García Vidagany won the title, defeating Yuliya Beygelzimer and Olga Savchuk in the final, 6–1, 6–2.

Seeds

Draw

References 
 Draw

Open Feminin De Marseille - Doubles